Chekhreh Mahalleh (also Romanized as Chekhreh Maḩalleh; also known as Chekhr Maḩalleh) is a village in Asalem Rural District, Asalem District, Talesh County, Gilan Province, Iran. At the 2006 census, its population was 849, in 196 families.

References 

Populated places in Talesh County